Nadya Larouche (Pointe-du-Lac, 1956-) is a Canadian writer from Quebec. After studying in University of Ottawa, she travelled to Mexico, West Canada and Ontario. When she was back in Quebec, she published several books for children and theatre plays.

Works
Les mystères de l'île Brisée, 1994
Mission spéciale pour l'AAA, 1994
L'aventurière du 1588, 1994
Curieuse visite chez l'apprentie sorcière, 1995
L'étrange coffre-fort d'Oscar W. Dunlop, 1995
Nord-est vers l'inconnu, 1995
Les prisonniers de l'autre monde, 1995
Alerte à la folie, 1996
Cauchemar sous la lune, 1996
L’armoire aux trois miroirs, 1997
La forêt des Matatouis, 1997
Le génie des perséides, 1997
L'ennemi aux griffes d'acier, 1998
La foire aux mille périls, 1998
L'hallucinant passage vers Krullin, 1998

References

1956 births
Living people
Writers from Quebec
Canadian writers in French